Maulana Muhammad Syed Masoodi (1905-1990) was a Kashmiri politician belonging to the National Conference party. He functioned as the General Secretary of the party for several years. He was nominated as a member of the Constituent Assembly of India, and was also elected as a member of the Constituent Assembly of Jammu and Kashmir.

Biography 
Masoodi was born on 27 January 1905.

He was the General Secretary of the Jammu and Kashmir National Conference from 1934 to 1953. Masoodi wrote an anthem for the State of Kashmir.

On 13 December 1990, Masoodi was assassinated by Kashmiri separatist militants.

References 

1905 births
People from Srinagar
Members of the Constituent Assembly of India
1990 deaths